Wayne Gordon (born March 30, 1963 in Victoria, British Columbia) is a retired boxer from Canada, who competed for his native country at the 1984 Summer Olympics in Los Angeles, California. There he was defeated in the first round of the men's welterweight (– 67 kg) division by eventual American gold medalist Mark Breland. He also represented Canada at the 1983 Pan American Games.

1984 Olympic results
Below is the record of Wayne Gordon, a Canadian welterweight boxer who competed at the 1984 Los Angeles Olympics:

 Round of 64: lost to Mark Breland (United States) by decision, 0-5

References

 Profile

1963 births
Living people
Welterweight boxers
Boxers at the 1983 Pan American Games
Pan American Games competitors for Canada
Boxers at the 1984 Summer Olympics
Olympic boxers of Canada
Sportspeople from Victoria, British Columbia
Canadian male boxers